Britannia Range may refer to:

 Britannia Range (Antarctica)
 Britannia Range (Canada) in the North Shore Mountains north of Vancouver